Patrice Victor Cormier (born June 14, 1990) is a Canadian professional ice hockey forward. He is currently under contract with Avtomobilist Yekaterinburg of the Kontinental Hockey League (KHL). Cormier was drafted in the second round, 54th overall, by the New Jersey Devils at the 2008 NHL Entry Draft.

Cormier was the captain for Team Canada at the 2010 World Junior Ice Hockey Championships. On January 25, 2010, Cormier was suspended for the remainder of the 2009–10 QMJHL regular season and playoffs for an elbow he delivered to Mikael Tam of the Quebec Remparts. Shortly after, his NHL rights were traded to the Atlanta Thrashers.

Playing career

Junior

Rimouski Océanic
Cormier started his Quebec Major Junior Hockey League (QMJHL) career with the Rimouski Océanic. During his rookie season he scored 11 goals and added 10 assists 53 games. He also represented New Brunswick in the ice hockey tournament at the 2007 Canada Games, where Cormier scored seven goals and thirteen assists in six games played as his team finished in seventh place. Cormier followed that up in the 2007–08 season, in which he posted 18 goals and 23 assists with 84 PIMs in 51 games. However, during the 2007–08 season, Cormier was riddled with injuries, including a burst appendix, concussion, and a pair of shoulder problems, all of which hampered his play and his draft position.  The New Jersey Devils drafted him with the 54th overall pick.

Cormier experienced a breakout performance during the 2008–09 QMJHL season, in which he posted career highs of 23 goals, 28 assists, 51 points, and 118 PIMs. His great performance continued with the QMJHL playoffs in which he led Rimouski to the playoff semifinals with four goals and six assists in 13 games, along with 30 PIMs, and the squad qualified for the 2009 Memorial Cup. While competing with the Océanic, Patrice followed the QMJHL playoffs with strong Memorial Cup play and was named to the tournament All-Star team.

Rouyn-Noranda Huskies
Cormier was traded from Rimouski to the Rouyn-Noranda Huskies. Shortly after he was traded, Cormier was involved in an incident where he severely injured an opponent, Mikael Tam of the Quebec Remparts, with an elbow that sent the latter player to hospital. The Remparts filed a police complaint over the hit. Cormier faced criminal charges over the hit against Tam.

On January 18, 2010, Cormier was suspended indefinitely by the QMJHL pending a full review of the incident. On January 25, 2010, Cormier was suspended by the QMJHL for the rest of the 2010 season. He finished his Rouyn-Noranda Huskies career with five assists in three games, before the season-ending (and QMJHL career-ending) suspension.

Professional
On February 4, 2010, Cormier was traded to the Atlanta Thrashers along with Johnny Oduya, Niclas Bergfors and a first round draft pick in the 2010 NHL Entry Draft for Ilya Kovalchuk.  After Rouyn-Noranda was eliminated from the QMJHL playoffs, Cormier was named to the playoff roster for the Chicago Wolves of the American Hockey League (AHL). His first NHL goal was scored on January 7, 2011 against James Reimer of the Toronto Maple Leafs. Once the Thrashers relocated to Winnipeg, Cormier was assigned to the St. John's Ice Caps of the AHL. The Winnipeg Jets recalled Cormier several times from the Ice Caps, the last time being on November 4, 2015.

Cormier began the 2015–16 season with the Manitoba Moose and was named an alternate captain.

Out of contract with the Winnipeg Jets in the off-season, Cormier opted to remain with their affiliate, the Manitoba Moose, signing a one-year AHL deal on August 30, 2016, and was later named team captain on October 14, 2016, shortly before the 2016–17 season began. On July 5, 2017, he continued his tenure with the Moose and agreed to a one-year extension on July 5, 2017.

After three seasons with the Moose, Cormier opted to leave North America and agreed to a one-year contract with Kazakhstani club, Barys Astana of the KHL on July 2, 2018. Cormier was instantly a success with Barys, scoring 18 goals and 40 points in 56 games in the 2018–19 season. He registered a further 4 points in 11 post-season games, helping Barys advance to the second round.

As a free agent from Barys, Cormier continued in the KHL, securing a lucrative one-year contract with Russian club, Ak Bars Kazan, on May 4, 2019.

Following two seasons with Ak Bars, Cormier left the club as a free agent and continued his tenure in the KHL by agreeing to a two-year contract with Avtomobilist Yekaterinburg on May 3, 2021.

International play

Cormier represented Canada in the IIHF World Junior Ice Hockey Championship in 2009 on their way to a gold medal and scored a goal and had two assists in six games. At the 2010 event, he served as the captain of Canada, and added two goals and three assists in six games as Canada took home silver.

Family
Cormier married Tanya in 2016 and had his first child in August 2018. His older brother Kevin was selected by the Phoenix Coyotes in the sixth round of the 2004 NHL Entry Draft.

Career statistics

Regular season and playoffs

International

Awards and honours

References

External links

1990 births
Acadian people
Ak Bars Kazan players
Atlanta Thrashers players
Avtomobilist Yekaterinburg players
Barys Nur-Sultan players
Canadian ice hockey centres
Chicago Wolves players
Ice hockey people from New Brunswick
Living people
Manitoba Moose players
Maritime Junior Hockey League players
New Jersey Devils draft picks
People from Westmorland County, New Brunswick
Rimouski Océanic players
Rouyn-Noranda Huskies players
St. John's IceCaps players
Winnipeg Jets players